Ternivskyi District is an urban district of Kryvyi Rih City, southeastern-central Ukraine. Population: 83 000 (2013 population estimate).

References

Urban districts of Kryvyi Rih